The II Southern Cross Games (Spanish: Juegos Cruz del Sur) were a multi-sport event held in 1982 in Rosario, Argentina, with some events in Santa Fe, Buenos Aires (sailing) and Esperanza. This was the second and last edition under this name of what would be renamed the South American Games, organized by the South American Sports Organization (ODESUR).
An appraisal of the games and detailed medal lists were published elsewhere,  emphasizing the results of the Argentinian teams.  Torch lighter was rower Gerardo Constantini.

Colombia and Venezuela had their first appearance at the games resulting in a total of 10 teams participating.



Venues

The Estadio Gigante de Arroyito was the main venues of the games, hosting the opening ceremony and the football tournaments. Many events were held at different venues located within the limits of Parque de la Independencia, the largest and most important public park in the city, including Newell's Old Boys' and Club Atlético Provincial's indoor arenas, both opened in 1982 to host the event. The Jorge Newbery Municipal Sports Complex, also  in the park, hosted the swimming and tennis, while the recently opened Patinódromo Municipal "Roberto Tagliabué" (Municipal Skating Rink) was the site for roller sports events.

The city of Santa Fe hosted the sailing events, the Centro de Alto Rendimiento Deportivo Pedro Candioti (Card) was the venue for athletics and the stadium of National Technological University – Santa Fe Regional Faculty held volleyball matches.

Medal count

The medal count for these Games is tabulated below. This table is sorted by the number of gold medals earned by each country. The number of silver medals is taken into consideration next, and then the number of bronze medals.

Sports

A total number of 961 athletes from 10 countries competed for medals in twenty sports:

Aquatic sports
 Swimming
 Synchronized swimming
 Athletics
 Baseball†
 Basketball†
 Boxing
Cycling
 Road Cycling
 Track Cycling
 Equestrian‡
 Fencing
 Football†
Gymnastics
 Artistic gymnastics
 Trampoline
 Judo†
Roller sports
 Artistic roller skating
 Roller hockey
 Roller speed skating
 Rowing
 Sailing
 Shooting
 Table tennis
 Tennis†
 Volleyball†
 Weightlifting
 Wrestling

Notes

†: Competition reserved to junior representatives (U-20).

‡: Equestrian is not explicitly listed in the overview of the competitions held at the 1982 games.  However, medal winners are published for individual and team show jumping events.

References

External links
Rosario 82 ODESUR page

 
South American Games
S
S
S
1982 in South American sport
Multi-sport events in Argentina
Sport in Rosario, Santa Fe
November 1982 sports events in South America
December 1982 sports events in South America